Chaksar (also Romanized as Chāksar) is a village in Dabuy-ye Shomali Rural District, Sorkhrud District, Mahmudabad County, Mazandaran Province, Iran. At the 2006 census, its population was 518, in 139 families.

References 

Populated places in Mahmudabad County